Below is the list of populated places in Kırıkkale Province, Turkey by the districts. In the following lists first place in each list is the administrative center of the district.

Kırıkkale
 Kırıkkale
 Ahılı, Kırıkkale 	
 Dağevi, Kırıkkale 	
 Hacılar, Kırıkkale 	
 Hasandede, Kırıkkale 	
 Karacaali, Kırıkkale 	
 Kazmaca, Kırıkkale 	
 Kızıldere, Kırıkkale 	
 Pazarcık, Kırıkkale 	
 Ulaş, Kırıkkale 	
 Yukarımahmutlar, Kırıkkale

Bahşili
 Bahşili
 Çamlıca, Bahşili 	
 Karaahmetli, Bahşili 	
 Küçüksarıkayalar, Bahşili 	
 Küreboğazı, Bahşili 	
 Sarıkayalar, Bahşili

Ballışeyh
 Ballışeyh
 Akçakavak, Ballışeyh 	
 Aşağıkarakısık, Ballışeyh 	
 Aydınşıh, Ballışeyh 	
 Battaloba, Ballışeyh 	
 Beşbıçak, Ballışeyh 	
 Beyoba, Ballışeyh 	
 Bıyıkaydın, Ballışeyh 	
 Dikmen, Ballışeyh 	
 Eldelek, Ballışeyh 	
 Hıdırşıh, Ballışeyh 	
 Hüseyinoba, Ballışeyh 	
 Işıklar, Ballışeyh 	
 İzzettin, Ballışeyh 	
 Karalı, Ballışeyh 	
 Kargın, Ballışeyh 	
 Kenanoba, Ballışeyh 	
 Kılevli, Ballışeyh 	
 Kırlangıç, Ballışeyh 	
 Koçubaba, Ballışeyh 	
 Kösedurak, Ballışeyh 	
 Kulaksız, Ballışeyh 	
 Mehmetbeyobası, Ballışeyh 	
 Selamlı, Ballışeyh 	
 Ulaklı, Ballışeyh 	
 Uzunlar, Ballışeyh 	
 Yenice, Ballışeyh 	
 Yenilli, Ballışeyh 	
 Yukarıkarakısık, Ballışeyh

Çelebi
Çelebi
 Alıcıyeniyapan, Çelebi 	
 Çiftevi, Çelebi 	
 Hacıyusuflu, Çelebi 	
 Halildede, Çelebi 	
 İğdebeli, Çelebi 	
 Kaldırım, Çelebi 	
 Karaağaç, Çelebi 	
 Karaağıl, Çelebi 	
 Karabucak, Çelebi 	
 Karahacılı, Çelebi 	
 Karayakup, Çelebi 	
 Kepirli, Çelebi 	
 Tilkili, Çelebi

Delice
 Delice	
 Akboğaz, Delice 	
 Alcılı, Delice 	
 Arbişli, Delice 	
 Aşağıihsangazili, Delice 	
 Baraklı, Delice 	
 Bozköy, Delice 	
 Büyükafşar, Delice 	
 Büyükyağlı, Delice 	
 Coğul, Delice 	
 Çatallı, Delice 	
 Çatallıkarakoyunlu, Delice 	
 Çerikli, Delice 	
 Çongar, Delice 	
 Dağobası, Delice 	
 Derekışla, Delice 	
 Doğanören, Delice 	
 Elmalı, Delice 	
 Evliyalı, Delice 	
 Fadılobası, Delice 	
 Gözükızıllı, Delice 	
 Hacıobası, Delice 	
 Halitli, Delice 	
 Herekli, Delice 	
 İmirli, Delice 	
 Karaköseli, Delice 	
 Karpuz, Delice 	
 Kavakköy, Delice 	
 Kocabaş, Delice 	
 Kurtoğlu, Delice 	
 Kuzayyurt, Delice 	
 Küçükafşar, Delice 	
 Meşeyayla, Delice 	
 Ocakbaşı, Delice 	
 Sarıyaka, Delice 	
 Şahcalı, Delice 	
 Taşyazı, Delice 	
 Tatlıcak, Delice 	
 Tavaözü, Delice 	
 Tekkeköy, Delice 	
 Yaylayurt, Delice 	
 Yeniyapan, Delice

Karakeçili
 Karakeçili	
 Akkoşan, Karakeçili	
 Sulubük, Karakeçili

Keskin
 Keskin 	
 Armutlu, Keskin 	
 Aşağışıh, Keskin 	
 Barak, Keskin 	
 Barakobası, Keskin 	
 Beşler, Keskin 	
 Büyükceceli, Keskin 	
 Cabatobası, Keskin 	
 Cankurtaran, Keskin 	
 Cebrailli, Keskin 	
 Ceritkale, Keskin 	
 Ceritmüminli, Keskin 	
 Ceritobası, Keskin 	
 Cinali, Keskin 	
 Çalış, Keskin 	
 Çamurabatmaz, Keskin 	
 Çipideresi, Keskin 	
 Dağsolaklısı, Keskin 	
 Danacıobası, Keskin 	
 Efendiköy, Keskin 	
 Eminefendi, Keskin 	
 Eroğlu, Keskin 	
 Esatmüminli, Keskin 	
 Eskialibudak, Keskin 	
 Gazibeyli, Keskin 	
 Göçbeyli, Keskin 	
 Göktaş, Keskin 	
 Gülkonak, Keskin 	
 Hacıaliobası, Keskin 	
 Hacıömersolaklısı, Keskin 	
 Haydardede, Keskin 	
 İnziloğlu, Keskin 	
 Kaçakköy, Keskin 	
 Karafakılı, Keskin 	
 Kasımağa, Keskin 	
 Kavlak, Keskin 	
 Kavurgalı, Keskin 	
 Kayalaksolaklısı, Keskin 	
 Kevenli, Keskin 	
 Konur, Keskin 	
 Konurhacıobası, Keskin 	
 Köprüköy, Keskin 	
 Kurşunkaya, Keskin 	
 Kuzugüdenli, Keskin 	
 Müsellim, Keskin 	
 Olunlu, Keskin 	
 Ortasöken, Keskin 	
 Polatyurdu, Keskin 	
 Seyfli, Keskin 	
 Takazlı, Keskin 	
 Turhanlı, Keskin 	
 Üçevler, Keskin 	
 Üçkuyu, Keskin 	
 Yenialibudak, Keskin 	
 Yeniyapan, Keskin 	
 Yoncalı, Keskin

Sulakyurt
 Sulakyurt
 Ağaylı, Sulakyurt 	
 Akkuyu, Sulakyurt 	
 Alişeyhli, Sulakyurt 	
 Ambardere, Sulakyurt 	
 Ayvatlı, Sulakyurt 	
 Çayoba, Sulakyurt 	
 Çevrimli, Sulakyurt 	
 Danacı, Sulakyurt 	
 Deredüzü, Sulakyurt 	
 Esenpınar, Sulakyurt 	
 Faraşlı, Sulakyurt 	
 Güzelyurt, Sulakyurt 	
 Hamzalı, Sulakyurt 	
 İmamoğluçeşmesi, Sulakyurt 	
 Kalekışla, Sulakyurt 	
 Kıyıhalilinceli, Sulakyurt 	
 Kıyıkavurgalı, Sulakyurt 	
 Koruköy, Sulakyurt 	
 Ortaköy, Sulakyurt 	
 Sarıkızlı, Sulakyurt 	
 Sarımbey, Sulakyurt 	
 Sofularçiftliği, Sulakyurt 	
 Yağbasan, Sulakyurt 	
 Yeniceli, Sulakyurt 	
 Yeşilli, Sulakyurt 	
 Yeşilyazı, Sulakyurt

Yahşihan
 Yahşihan
 Bedesten, Yahşihan 	
 Hacıbalı, Yahşihan 	
 Hisarköy, Yahşihan 	
 Irmak, Yahşihan 	
 Keçili, Yahşihan 	
 Kılıçlar, Yahşihan 	
 Mahmutlar, Yahşihan

References

List
Kiirikkale